Earle Brent Higgins (born December 30, 1946) is a retired professional basketball power forward who spent one season in the American Basketball Association as a member of the Indiana Pacers during the 1970–71 season. He played at Casper College in Wyoming and then moved on to Eastern Michigan University. He was drafted from Eastern Michigan University during the third round of the 1970 NBA Draft by the San Francisco Warriors, but he did not play for them. He is the father of National Basketball Association (NBA) player Sean Higgins.

External links

1946 births
Living people
American men's basketball players
Basketball players from Michigan
Casper Thunderbirds men's basketball players
Eastern Michigan Eagles men's basketball players
Indiana Pacers players
Power forwards (basketball)
San Francisco Warriors draft picks